The Serie B 1942–43 was the fourteenth tournament of this competition played in Italy since its creation.

Teams
Cremonese, Anconitana, M.A.T.E.R. and Palermo had been promoted from Serie C, while Napoli and Modena had been relegated from Serie A.

Events
Goal average was abolished.

This was the last championship before a two-years break due to World War II.

Final classification

Results

Footnotes

References and sources
Almanacco Illustrato del Calcio - La Storia 1898-2004, Panini Edizioni, Modena, September 2005

Serie B seasons
2
Italy